Thomas Paley (24 January 1803 – 21 September 1860) was an English barrister and cricketer.

Life
He was the son of John Green Paley of Bradford. He matriculated at University College, Oxford in 1821, graduating B.A. in 1825. In 1828 he graduated M.A., and was called to the bar at Lincoln's Inn.

Paley was associated with Surrey and made his first-class cricket debut in 1829.

Family
Paley married in 1833 Sophia, daughter of Henry Perkins.

References

External links
Victorian Professions page

1803 births
1860 deaths
English barristers
English cricketers
English cricketers of 1826 to 1863
Surrey cricketers
Alumni of University College, Oxford
Members of Lincoln's Inn